Heart 104.9 FM is a 24-hour music radio station, situated in Greenpoint, Cape Town, South Africa, known as Cape Town's Beat.

Heart FM broadcasts in the greater Western Cape region including Cape Town (104.9FM) and surrounding areas including the Drakenstein (102.7FM), West Coast (106.3FM), Swartland (106.3FM), Overberg (88.1FM) and Overstrand 88.8FM

About
Heart FM broadcasts in the greater Western Cape region including Cape Town and surrounding areas including the Drakenstein, West Coast, Swartland, Overberg and Overstrand.

Heart FM listeners have strong family ties, are socially aware and committed to enjoying life to the full. Listeners are very brand conscious and are fiercely loyal to the Heart FM brand.

The station attracts more than 634 000 listeners weekly (RAMS 2015/1) with its mix of jazz, soul, pop, old school, house and disco – a perfect mix of old and new. Listeners are also spoilt for choice with intelligent talk and entertainment spanning across shows.

Heart FM broadcasts in English and Afrikaans.

History
Heart 104.9 FM was originally launched as P4 radio in July 1997. Then P4 radio was considered one of the fastest growing radio stations in South Africa at the time. P4 Radio was the first radio station is South Africa to target and attract high income earners from the black and coloured communities of South Africa and see positive growth in both revenue and audience. 8 years after inception P4 radio was re-launched as Heart 104.9 FM with the tag line 'Cape Town Soul'.  Prior to the name change research was done among the listeners and it was found that they had no strong attachment to the name and didn't mind it changing. In 2014, it has grown to the biggest radio station in Cape Town with it fondly known as “Cape Town’s Beat”. In 2013, the station increased their frequency to cover the Western Cape.

Team of DJs
The DJ line up currently consists of:

The Week Day Wake up with KB (Weekdays 4am-6am), Heart Breakfast with Aden Thomas (Weekdays 6am-9am) featuring Tapfuma Makina (sport) and Julian Naidoo (traffic), 9-12 with Irma G (Weekdays 9am-12pm), Lunchbox with Clarence Ford (Weekdays 12pm - 3pm) and Me Time with Clarence Ford Sunday's (6pm - 10pm), Drive 326 with Suga featuring Jeremy Harris on sport and Jo-Dee Butler on traffic, In the Mix with Diggy Bongz (Mon-Thur 6pm - 10pm), The Nightshift with JP Carelse (Sun - Thur 10 pm - 1am)

Weekends

The Heart Beat with Tyrone Paulsen (Fri & Sat 6pm - 10pm) The Weekend Party with Lunga Singama (Fri 10pm - 1 am), The Weekend Party With JP Carelse (Sat 10pm - 1am)

Saturday Breakfast with Jo-Dee Butler(6-9am), OTC (On the Couch) with Jeremy Harris (Saturday 9-10am), The CTM Heart Top 40 with Paul Playdon (Saturday 10am - 2pm), Lunga Singama (Saturday 2pm - 6pm), All Request Breakfast with Paul Playdon (Sunday 6am - 10am), Sunday Lunch with Lunga Singama (10am -2pm), Sound of Sunday with Irma G (2pm - 6pm), Me Time with Clarence Ford (6pm - 10pm)

Events
Heart FM has three signature annual events namely, Mommy and Me, #HeartBeats4Youth and Women At Heart  
 Mommy and Me is a celebration of mothers and children and traditionally takes place in the lead up to Mother's Day in May: Watch the video here: https://www.youtube.com/watch?v=b_hGbB82J24  
 #HeartBeats4Youth is a celebration of youth to coincide with Youth Month in June. The aim is to motivate, inspire and lend a hand where needed for the youth of the Western Cape. What started out at celebrities inspiring schools with motivational talks has morphed into a fully fledged 16-day campaign in 2015: Watch the video here: https://www.youtube.com/watch?v=bgcQDXcgxsM   
 Women At Heart is an annual celebrating of women and takes place in August each year. Heart FM treats around 600 women to a day of spoils and pampers with exquisite food and entertainment. Watch the video here: https://www.youtube.com/watch?v=9qGuY9uxWq0

Topics
#AR2L - Always Remember to Live:The #HeartBreakfast team had a Motto Monday where listeners and presenters were asked to share their life motto's. Always Remember To Live was the motto of sport presenter Tapfuma Makina. #AR2L generated a trend on Twitter as listeners got behind the saying
Heart Relay Event: Following the epic win of Wayde Van Niekerk who holds the World Record for the 400m sprint, the #HeartBreakfast team came up with an annual Heart Relay Event where they challenged the #Drive326 team to a run off. The breakfast team walked off with the title: Here's a look at the epic event: https://www.youtube.com/watch?v=ksRBEz8kOH4

Listenership Figures

References

External links 
Heart 104.9 FM Website
SAARF Website
Sentech Website

Radio stations established in 1997
Radio stations in Cape Town
1997 establishments in South Africa